Privacy screen may refer to:

 A room divider, especially one used for privacy while changing.
 A type of monitor filter that makes it difficult for someone other than the user to see the contents of the screen.